Jared Gertner is an American actor best known for his work in the American musical theater, including a co-starring role in the first touring and London productions of The Book of Mormon.

Life and career
Gertner was raised in Toms River, New Jersey in a Conservative Jewish family. His first acting work was at a theater operated by his aunt and uncle, where he debuted at age six as a Lost Boy in a production of Peter Pan. He earned a Bachelor of Fine Arts degree in drama at New York's Tisch School of the Arts.

Gertner's subsequent roles have included William Barfee in the San Francisco and Boston productions of The 25th Annual Putnam County Spelling Bee. After winning an IRNE Award (Independent Reviewers of New England) for Best Actor, he replaced Dan Fogler in the New York production. (Fogler had won a Tony in the role.) Gertner played Warren in Ordinary Days with New York's Roundabout Theatre Company and performed on the original cast recording. His other stage roles include Eubie the Happy Elf in the world premiere of Harry Connick Jr.'s The Happy Elf, Elliot in the world premier of Band Geeks with the Goodspeed Musicals company, and an improvisational role in Don't Quit Your Night Job. Gertner's television roles include guest appearances on Ugly Betty, How I Met Your Mother and The Good Wife.

Gertner was the understudy for Josh Gad in the role of Arnold Cunningham in the musical The Book of Mormon. With Gad's departure, Gertner took over the role on Broadway, then co-starred with Gavin Creel in the production's first national tour, debuting in August 2012 in Denver.  Gertner also co-starred with Creel in the London West End production of The Book of Mormon, which began previews on February 25, 2013.

Filmography

Film

Television

References

External links 
 
 

Living people
People from Toms River, New Jersey
Tisch School of the Arts alumni
American male web series actors
21st-century American male actors
Year of birth missing (living people)